The 2013–14 UC Davis Aggies men's basketball team represented the University of California, Davis during the 2013-14 NCAA Division I men's basketball season. The Aggies, led by third year head coach Jim Les, played their home games at The Pavilion as members of the Big West Conference. They finished the season 9–22, 4–12 in Big West play to finish in last place. They failed to qualify for the Big West Conference tournament.

Season

Preseason
Coach Jim Les wrapped up his 2013 recruiting class on May 8, 2013, with the announcement that forward Georgi Funtarov had chosen the Aggies and had signed his National Letter of Intent. Funtarov, who played for Vermont Academy in Saxtons River, Vermont, was rated a two-star recruit by ESPN, and joined San Diego prep player of the year and All-California team selection Brynton Lemar as the second member of UC Davis' recruiting class. Lemar was rated a three-star prospect by ESPN.

The Aggies announced their 2013–14 season schedule on July 30, 2013. Key games on UC Davis' schedule included trips to play Pac-12 Conference members Utah and Stanford, as well as hosting Mountain West Conference member Nevada and traveling to play first-year MWC member San Jose State. The Aggies also scheduled to play with Portland State and two other undetermined teams in the Portland State tournament in Portland, Oregon. The Aggies' 16-game conference schedule included home and away dates against each of the 8 other members of the Big West Conference.

On August 16, 2013, Les announced that junior forward J.T. Adenrele suffered a season-ending left knee injury during a non-contact drill and would miss the entire season. Les announced that Adenrele would be red-shirted for the season to preserve his eligibility. Adenrele averaged 12.6 points, 5.9 rebounds, and 1.5 blocks per game while starting all 31 games in 2012–13.

Roster

Schedule
Source:  

|-
!colspan=9 style="background:#CB992B; color:#182563;"| Exhibition

|-
!colspan=9 style="background:#CB992B; color:#182563;"| Non-Conference Games

|-
!colspan=9 style="background:#CB992B; color:#182563;"| Conference Games

References

UC Davis Aggies men's basketball seasons
UC Davis